Mount Petlock is the most prominent mountain (3,195 m) in the northeast part of Otway Massif, surmounting the north end of the ridge which borders the east side of Burgess Glacier. Named by Advisory Committee on Antarctic Names (US-ACAN) for James D. Petlock, United States Antarctic Research Program (USARP) ionospheric physicist at South Pole Station, 1963.

Mountains of the Ross Dependency
Dufek Coast